"The Red-Headed League" is the 12th episode of the series The Adventures of Sherlock Holmes, the first series in the Sherlock Holmes series which is based on Sir Arthur Conan Doyle stories. The series was produced by the British television company Granada Television between 1984 and 1994 and star Jeremy Brett as the famous detective. "The Red-Headed League" is based on the short story of the same title. The episode was first aired at 9:00 PM in the United Kingdom on Sunday, 22 September 1985 on ITV. It is the fifth of six episodes in the series' second season and the twelfth of the show overall.

The episode notably takes some creative liberty in adapting the source material, refashioning it into a prelude to the series' adaptation of "The Final Problem" and introducing the character Professor Moriarty.

Plot 
Jabez Wilson, a London pawnbroker, comes to consult Sherlock Holmes and Dr. Watson. Wilson tells them that some weeks before, his young assistant, Vincent Spaulding, urged him to respond to a newspaper want-ad offering highly-paid work to only red-headed male applicants. The next morning, Wilson had waited in a long line of fellow red-headed men, was interviewed and was the only applicant hired, because none of the other applicants qualified; their red hair was either too dark or too bright, and did not match Wilson's unique flame colour.

Wilson told Holmes that his business had been struggling. Since his pawn shop did most of its business in the evenings, he was able to vacate his shop for short periods in the afternoon, receiving £4 a week for several weeks. The work was obviously useless clerical work in a bare office, only performed for nominal compliance with a will, whereupon he was made to copy the Encyclopædia Britannica. Wilson learned much about the subjects starting with the "A" version and looked forward to getting into the "B" section. One morning, a sign on the locked office door inexplicably announced that the League had been dissolved.

Wilson went to the landlord, who said that he had never heard of Duncan Ross, the person who managed the league office. The landlord did remember the tenant with scarlet hair and gives him a card which directs Wilson to an artificial knee company. Wilson believes himself to have been the target of a practical joke. Holmes and Watson laugh at Wilson, but Holmes assures him that by Monday they will have solved the case. Ross informs his enigmatic employer that the "business" of the League has ended. Holmes decides to go and see Spaulding, who Holmes notices has dirty trouser knees. Holmes then taps on the pavement in front of the pawnbroker's shop. With the case solved, he calls Police Inspector Jones and Mr. Merryweather, a director of the bank located next door.

The four hide themselves in the bank vault and confront the thieves when they show up. They are John Clay, the Eton- and Oxford-educated grandson of a Royal Duke, considered by Holmes to be the fourth-smartest man in London, who has a long history of criminal activity and his helper Archie. Under the aliases of Spaulding and Ross, they had contrived the 'Red-Headed League' rigmarole to keep Wilson out of his shop while they dug in the basement, in order to break into the bank vault next door. Holmes reveals that their employer was his own nemesis: Professor Moriarty. Although paying Jabez Wilson four pounds a week was expensive, it was a pittance compared to the ill-gotten thousands they were looking to steal from the bank. Holmes gifts Wilson with fifty sovereigns. Moriarty claims that this is the third time that Holmes has been actively involved in his affairs, and vows to defeat him.

Cast 
 Jeremy Brett – Sherlock Holmes
 David Burke – Dr. Watson
 Roger Hammond – Jabez Wilson
 Tim McInnerny – John Clay
 Eric Porter – Professor Moriarty
 Richard Wilson – Duncan Ross
 John Woodnutt – Mr. Merryweather
 Bruce Dukov – Sarasate
 John Labanowski – Athelney Jones
 Reginald Stewart – Doorman (as Reg Stewart)
 Ian Bleasdale – Accountant
 Malcolm Weaver – Archie

See also
 Sherlock Holmes (1984 TV series)
 List of Sherlock Holmes episodes

References

External links
 

1985 British television episodes